Polyptychoides vuattouxi is a moth of the  family Sphingidae. It is known from Sierra Leone, Ivory Coast and Ghana.

References

Polyptychoides
Moths described in 1989